43 Aurigae is a star located 382 light years away from the Sun in the northern constellation of Auriga. It is just bright enough to be barely visible to the naked eye with an apparent visual magnitude of 6.33. The star is moving closer to the Earth with a heliocentric radial velocity of −3.4 km/s.

This is an aging giant star with a stellar classification of K2 III, having exhausted the hydrogen at its core and expanded off the main sequence. Roughly three billion years old, this star has 1.43 times the mass of the Sun and 11 times the Sun's radius. It is radiating 49 times the luminosity of the Sun from its swollen photosphere at an effective temperature of 4,552 K.

References

K-type giants
Auriga (constellation)
Durchmusterung objects
Aurigae, 43
043380
029949
2239